Jan Jacobsen (born 5 March 1963) is a Danish archer. He competed in the men's individual and team events at the 1988 Summer Olympics.

References

External links
 

1963 births
Living people
Danish male archers
Olympic archers of Denmark
Archers at the 1988 Summer Olympics
People from Silkeborg
Sportspeople from the Central Denmark Region
20th-century Danish people